The Torneo Internacional PSA Sporta 2016 is the men's edition of the 2016 Torneo Internacional PSA Sporta, which is a tournament of the PSA World Tour event International (prize money: $50,000). The event took place in Santa Catarina Pinula in Guatemala from 18 September to 21 May. Borja Golán won his first Torneo Internacional PSA Sporta trophy, beating César Salazar in the final.

Prize money and ranking points
For 2016, the prize purse was $ 50,000. The prize money and points breakdown was as follows:

Seeds

Draw and results

See also
2016 PSA World Tour
Torneo Internacional PSA Sporta

References

External links
PSA Torneo Internacional PSA Sporta 2016 website
Torneo Internacional PSA Sporta squashsite page

Torneo Internacional PSA Sporta
Torneo Internacional PSA Sporta